Sarah Sayifwanda (16 January 1963 – 31 December 2020) was a Zambian politician who served as Minister of Gender and Development and Minister of Agriculture and Cooperatives. She was also the Zambian representative to the African Union and Pan-African Parliament.

Early life and education
Sarah Sayifwanda was born on 16 January 1963, and was graduated with a Bachelor of Arts in special education.

Career

Zambian Government

Mwanwasa Administration
Sayifwanda served from Zambezi East in the National Assembly of Zambia as a member of the Movement for Multiparty Democracy from 2006 to 2011, and as a member of the United Party for National Development from 2011 to 2016. She was a backbencher in the legislature. Levy Mwanawasa appointed Sayifwanda as Minister of Agriculture and Cooperatives when he was elected. Mwanawasa created the Ministry of Gender and Women in Development in 2006. At the time, Patricia Mulasikwanda was appointed minister.

Banda Administration
On 14 November 2008, Zambian President Rupiah Banda renamed the Ministry of Gender and Women in Development to the Ministry of Gender and Development, with Sayifwanda as minister. She held this role until 2011. While minister, Sayifwanda focused on decreasing the use of women to traffic drugs, promoting women's representation in politics, fighting marital violence, and providing support for people with intellectual disabilities.

Sata Administration
Sayifwanda was appointed as Gender Deputy Minister by Michael Sata of the Patriotic Front in 2011, but declined the role. She later defected from the Movement for Multiparty Democracy to the United Party for National Development (UPND) with ten other MMD members of parliament.

In 2019, Zambian police arrested Sayifwanda for allegedly inciting a tribal fight between the Lundas and Luvales during an Electoral Commission of Zambia delimitation.

Death and legacy
Sayifwanda died on 31 December 2020 at Solwezi General Hospital due to illness. She was granted an official state funeral and day of national mourning (5 January 2021) by President Edgar Lungu. She was laid to rest in Kimeteto Cemetery in Solwezi. Sayifwanda's service at United Church of Zambia Trinity Congregation was widely attended by politicians from both her party and the opposition. Some of the attendees included North Western Province Minister Nathaniel Mubukwanu, UPND leader Hakainde Hichilema, and PF official Koshita Shengamo. She was a trustee of UPND.

References

1963 births
2020 deaths
Movement for Multi-Party Democracy politicians
Zambian democracy activists
United Party for National Development politicians
21st-century Zambian women politicians
21st-century Zambian politicians
Zambian women in politics